Four Seasons Hotel Taipei is an under-construction skyscraper hotel located in Xinyi Planning District, Xinyi District, Taipei, Taiwan. The hotel held its groundbreaking ceremony on 2 January 2022 and is estimated to be completed by 2025. The hotel is constructed by Yuanlih Group and jointly designed by Yabu Pushelberg and Richard Rogers.

Location
The hotel is located directly opposite to Taipei 101 in the Xinyi Planning District, which contains numerous shopping centres, entertainment venues and tourist attractions, such as the Taipei World Trade Center, National Sun Yat-sen Memorial Hall and Taipei 101. It is one minute's walk from Taipei 101–World Trade Center metro station.

Facilities
Four Seasons Hotel Taipei will be operated by Four Seasons Hotels and Resorts and will offer a total of 260 guest rooms and suites with city and mountain views, spanning a total of 31 floors. Aside from accommodation, the hotel will also include three restaurants, three bars and lounges, a fitness center, an outdoor pool and spa, two ballrooms, as well as meeting and event spaces.

See also 
 List of tallest buildings in Taiwan
 List of tallest buildings in Taipei
 West Gateway Marriott Hotel
 Solaria Nishitetsu Hotel Taipei

References

Buildings and structures under construction in Taiwan
Skyscraper hotels in Taipei